Huntington Courthouse Square Historic District is a national historic district located at Huntington, Huntington County, Indiana.   The district includes 102 contributing buildings and 3 contributing structures in the central business district of Huntington. It developed between about 1845 and 1942 and includes notable examples of Italianate, Queen Anne style architecture in the United States, Romanesque Revival, Neoclassical, and Commercial style architecture. Located in the district are the separately listed Moore/Carlew Building and Hotel LaFontaine.  Other notable buildings include the Hotel Huntington (1848), Opera House (1881), Lewis Block, Huntington County Courthouse (1904), old Post Office (1916), Citizens' State Bank (c. 1927), City Hall / Fire Station (1904), Huntington Light and Fuel Building, Our Sunday Visitor building (1926), YMCA (1929), and Huntington Theater (1904, 1940).

It was listed on the National Register of Historic Places in 1992.

References

County courthouses in Indiana
Historic districts on the National Register of Historic Places in Indiana
Courthouses on the National Register of Historic Places in Indiana
Italianate architecture in Indiana
Queen Anne architecture in Indiana
Romanesque Revival architecture in Indiana
Neoclassical architecture in Indiana
Government buildings completed in 1904
Historic districts in Huntington County, Indiana
National Register of Historic Places in Huntington County, Indiana